The Fourth Alaska State Legislature served from January 25, 1965, to January 22, 1967.

Senate

Senate members

Senate leadership
 Senate President: Robert J. McNealy (D-Fairbanks)
 Majority Leader: Frank Peratrovich (D-Fairbanks)
 Minority Leader: Brad Phillips (R-Anchorage)

Senate committee assignments
 Commerce
 Nolan (chair), Foster, Ziegler, Hansen, Pollock
 Finance
 Bradshaw (chair), Blodgett, Harrison, Walsh, Kilcher, Phillips, Peter
 Health, Welfare and Education
 Hall (chair), Ziegler, Begich, Hopson, Phillips
 Judiciary
 Ziegler (chair), Nolan, Hall, Begich, Pollock
 Labor and Management
 Foster (chair), Pearson, Hansen, Owen, Phillips
 Local Government
 Hansen (chair), Hopson, Peter, Pearson, Pollock
 Resources
 Kilcher (chair), Peratrovich, Harrison, Foster, Butrovich
 Rules
 Peratrovich (chair), Bradshaw, Hall, Walsh, Pollock
 State Affairs
 Harrison (chair), Blodgett, Peter, Owen, Butrovich

House

House members

House leadership
 Speaker of the House: Mike Gravel (D-Anchorage)
 Majority Leader: Robert I. Ditman (D-Valdez)
 Minority Leader: William K. Boardman (R-Ketchikan)

House committee assignments
 Commerce
 Moseley (chair), Guess, Plotnick, Pinkerton, Hillstrand, Boardman, Brady
 Finance
 Kerttula (chair), Ray, Balone, Sassara, Jackson, Strandberg, Haugen
 Health, Welfare and Education
 Pinkerton (chair), Johnson, Metcalf, Sheldon, Plotnick, Rader, Tillion, Moses, Wold
 Judiciary
 Guess (chair), Josephson, Metcalf, Hillstrand, Taylor, Tillion, Stevens
 Labor and Management
 See (chair), Orbeck, Josephson, Johnson, McGill, Kendall, Engstrom
 Local Government
 Poland (chair), O'Connell, Stalker, Lottsfeldt, Rader, Engstrom, Wold
 Resources
 Christiansen (chair), McCombe, Stalker, Skinner, McGill, Poland, Sheldon, See, Tillion, Moses, Brady
 Rules
 Taylor (chair), Ditman, LeFevre, Josephson, Carr, Boardman, Kendall
 State Affairs
 LeFevre (chair), Carr, O'Connell, Lottsfeldt, Skinner, Orbeck, Engstrom, Stevens, Boardman

See also
 List of Alaska State Legislatures
 3rd Alaska State Legislature, the legislature preceding this one
 5th Alaska State Legislature, the legislature following this one
 List of governors of Alaska
 List of speakers of the Alaska House of Representatives
 Alaska Legislature
 Alaska Senate
 {AKLeg.gov}

References
General
 

Specific and Notes

1965 establishments in Alaska
Alaska
1966 in Alaska
Alaska
1967 disestablishments in the United States
04